{{Infobox television 
| image                = Robert Guenette dinosaur documentary 1985.jpg
| image_size           =
| image_alt            =
| caption              = Dinosaur!s opening credits
| genre                =
| writer               = Steven Paul Mark
| director             = Robert Guenette
| starring             =
| music                =
| presenter            = Christopher Reeve
| country              = United States
| language             = English
| producer             =
| executive_producer   = Robert GuenetteSteven Paul Mark
| editor               =
| cinematography       = Philip Hurn
| runtime              = 60 minutes
| company              = Phillips Mark ProductionsRobert Guenette Productions
| distributor          =
| budget               =
| network              = CBS
| first_aired          = 
| last_aired           =
| preceded_by          =
| followed_by          =
}}Dinosaur!''' is a 1985 American television documentary film about dinosaurs. It was first broadcast in the United States on November 5, 1985, on CBS. Directed by Robert Guenette and written by Steven Paul Mark, Dinosaur! was hosted by the American actor Christopher Reeve, who some years before had played the leading role of Superman.

In 1991, another documentary, also titled Dinosaur! though not related, was hosted on A&E by the CBS anchorman Walter Cronkite.
Content
Jointly with Reeve's narration, the documentary shows special effects scenes which reconstruct dinosaurs and their era, along with interviews with the most famous paleontologists at the time of the documentary shooting, including Jack Horner, Robert Bakker, Phil Currie, and Dale Russell.

After a short introductory sequence and the subsequent opening credits the film starts with the mating of hadrosaurs, a species which in the documentary is identified as "hadrosaur", "the duck-billed dinosaur" or "duck-bill". The female soon lays a clutch of eggs that are eaten by a Struthiomimus, except for one. When the Struthiomimus eats the last egg it stole, it is then hunted and killed by a pair of Deinonychus. The remaining hadrosaur egg hatches and grows into a juvenile. While it is out grazing with its parents, it wanders off and it almost gets killed by a Tyrannosaurus rex, but the parents hear its cries and come to the rescue. While one of the parents looks after the juvenile, the other one faces the theropod and knocks it over with its strong, 2,000-pound tail. Once down, the Tyrannosaurus could not get up easily, so the herbivore is given a chance to escape. Once all three hadrosaurs are happily back together and the Tyrannosaurus is back on its feet, the latter defeatedly walks back into the forest.

Next, a herd of Brontosaurus is shown, busy eating leaves from tall trees. They use their long necks to reach high branches.

Next, a herd of Monoclonius is seen grazing. One member wanders off into the forest in search of flowers. Night falls and it tries to find the herd. It soon stumbles upon the remains of a killed hadrosaur and becomes wary. The Tyrannosaurus then ambushes it and bites hard on its back. The Monoclonius breaks free and stabs the Tyrannosaurus in the shin, which only infuriates the predator. The Monoclonius becomes cornered and is killed.

That night, all seems calm. Suddenly, an asteroid crashes into Earth and kills the dinosaurs. After that, a small mouse-like mammal (live-acted by an opossum) is seen climbing out of a hole in the ground, among the bones of a dead hadrosaur, signaling the start of mammals ruling the Earth.

The documentary also discusses the overgrowing popularity of dinosaurs, as well as the possibility of living cryptids such as the Loch Ness Monster and Mokele-mbembe.

Scientific terminology in Dinosaur!
The genus Brontosaurus is named as such in the documentary, although at that time (1985) the scientific consensus considered it to be synonymous with Apatosaurus. Also, at the beginning of the documentary, Christopher Reeve, who hosts the programme, mentions several dinosaur genera. Starting with Hadrosaurus, Reeve signs to the audience that dinosaur names are fun to say, but this is the only moment in Dinosaur! when the genus Hadrosaurus is mentioned as such. For the rest of the programme, including the segments referring to the specimens studied in Montana by Jack Horner (genus Maiasaura though not mentioned as such in the documentary), both Reeve and the narrator use the term "duck-billed" which refers to all hadrosaurids. Hadrosaurus, as a genus, refers to one single species and specimen found in New Jersey. The documentary Dinosaur! abundantly uses the term "duck-billed", thus referring to all hadrosaurids, not only to the genus Hadrosaurus.

Inconsistencies
All six species of dinosaurs shown in the special effects sequences are presented as contemporary to each other. The documentary provides the audience with valuable data but doesn't situate those species in their respective geologic time scale periods. The dinosaurs featured alongside each other in overlapping sequences are duck-billed dinosaurs (which are hadrosaurids), Struthiomimus, Deinonychus, Tyrannosaurus, Monoclonius and even Brontosaurus. That latter first appears in a separated sequence but is later shown during the KT event. This situates all those animals as contemporary species during the extinction event at the end of the Cretaceous period, which is inconsistent. In reality, Brontosaurus belongs to the Jurassic period and only Struthiomimus, Tyrannosaurus and some hadrosaur species were contemporaries at the end of the Cretaceous period, the remains of them having been found in geological layers of the Hell Creek Formation. Deinonychus fossils have been found only in Early Cretaceous rocks, and Monoclonius, which is now considered a synonym of Centrosaurus, belongs to an earlier age of the Late Cretaceous period.

Origins of the project
Immediately before working in the full length television documentary Dinosaur!, Phil Tippett had been working in an experimental sequence lasting ten minutes. Conceived and created by Tippett with the help of Industrial Light & Magic stop-motion animators Randy Dutra (who made the dinosaur molds and skins) and Tom St. Amand (who made the inner articulated metallic skeletons of the dinosaurs), this original sequence was titled Prehistoric Beast and tried to improve go motion animation special effects techniques. The story of the short was simple: the chase and predation of a Monoclonius by a Tyrannosaurus. This short animated film was only released in specialized animation festivals in 1984, but it convinced Robert Guenette and Steven Paul Mark to request Tippett's skills in order to transform it into a full-length documentary. They then asked Tippett to realise new sequences with other dinosaur species, like hadrosaurs, Deinonychus, Struthiomimus and Brontosaurus, while stock footage from the 1979 film Meteor was used to depict an asteroid, the one supposed to have crashed into the Earth, causing the dinosaur's extinction. Adding all this new material to the material from Prehistoric Beast resulted in the 1985 Dinosaur! documentary.

The go motion animation technique was first used by Tippett in the Star Wars original trilogy of films (1977, 1980, 1983), especially in the second installment, The Empire Strikes Back (1980), animating the tauntauns and the AT-ATs seen in the film. In 1983, when his work with the original Star Wars trilogy was finished, Tippett went on to improve his animation technique by means of Prehistoric Beast (1984). He further improved the technique when his Tippet Studio was appointed for the special effects of Dinosaur! (first aired in 1985). Tippet's experimental work on those two films about dinosaurs helped with the animatics and CGI animated dinosaur sequences he made later for Jurassic Park (1993).

Shooting, airings and VHS releasesDinosaur! was mainly shot in New York City and Los Angeles, and in some fossiliferous locations of the United States. Christopher Reeve was a "Dino fan" and demonstrated his enthusiasm for the shooting by flying with his own airplane to the American Museum of Natural History in New York and requesting himself the re-shooting of several scenes.

The special effects were mainly made in Phil Tippett's garage. Tippett received assistance from Industrial Light & Magic stop-motion animators Randy Dutra (who made the dinosaur molds and skins) and Tom St. Amand (who made the inner articulated metallic skeletons of the dinosaurs).

Some excerpts from old films were shown in Dinosaur! in order to explain how popular dinosaurs were in cinema. One of those excerpts was a scene from King Kong (1933), in which a character pronounces the words "prehistoric beast", which is the title chosen by Phil Tippett for his experimental short.Dinosaur! was shown again on the Disney Channel during the 1990s before it went from being a premium pay channel on cable to a standard channel. It had a VHS release on May 5, 1993, by Family Home Entertainment.

Legacy
Some footage of Dinosaur! was re-dubbed with different sound effects and music in the original 3D Dinosaur Adventure for MS-DOS operating systems by Knowledge Adventure. It was used in again the 1995 and 1996 Windows remake of the game. They appeared in the 1993 PC-video game called Microsoft Dinosaurs. They appeared in the 1998 ABC World Reference game called Wide World of Dinosaurs for Microsoft Windows and Apple Macintosh operating systems by Creative Wonders. Footage of Dinosaur! was also used in Really Wild Animals for the episode Dinosaurs and Other Creature Features''.

Awards
 Primetime Emmy Award for Outstanding Special Visual Effects (1986)

See also
 Tippett Studio

Notes and references

External links
 
 
 Overview of the Dinosaur Documentary

1985 television specials
Films about dinosaurs
American documentary television films
Films using stop-motion animation
Documentary films about dinosaurs
1985 documentary films
1985 films
Television shows directed by Robert Guenette
CBS television specials
1980s American films